Sir David Hugh Wootton (born 21 July 1950) is an English lawyer and politician. He was the 684th Lord Mayor of London, from 2011 to 2012, and is the Alderman of the Ward of Langbourn.

Early life 
Wootton was educated at Bradford Grammar School before going up to Jesus College, Cambridge, to read Classics and then Law. While at Cambridge he also captained his college’s boat club in 1972 and rowed in the First Boat which swept the board against all comers – and until he became Lord Mayor he endeavoured to row there once a year with his contemporaries.

Career 
From 1979 to 2015 Wootton was a partner at Allen & Overy, the international law firm headquartered in London with offices in 30 countries, specialising in corporate transactions and best-practice compliance with law and regulation in corporate governance. This involves dealing with mergers and acquisitions, IPOs and joint ventures across various international markets.

Having a strong interest in the governance of the City of London, Wootton stood for election to Common Council and was elected as Commoncouncilman for the Ward of Farringdon Within in 2002. In 2005 he was elected Alderman for the Ward of Langbourn. He was Deputy Chairman of the Finance Committee and a member of the Policy and Resources and the City Lands and Bridge House Estates Committees. In 2009 he was elected Aldermanic Sheriff before serving as Lord Mayor of London for 2011–12. 

Wootton is chairman of the General Purposes Committee of Aldermen, which oversees the work of the Lord Mayor, the Sheriffs and the Court of Aldermen and the operations of Mansion House. He chairs the Mayoral Visits Advisory Committee, which decides on and manages the programme of oversees visits by the Lord Mayor and Sheriffs, and serves on the Magistracy and Livery Sub Committee. He sits on the Policy & Resources Committee and the Resource Allocation and Public Relations and Economic Development Sub Committees, and is deputy chairman of the Courts Sub Committee, of the Policy & Resources Committee. He is chairman of the Freedom Applications Committee, which reviews applications for Freedom of the City of London.

Wootton has made time throughout his career to devote to charitable and community activities in promotion of education and sport. Away from the Corporation of London, he is:

 Member of the Board of TheCityUK and the City Corporation's lead representative on the TheCityUK Brexit Law Committee, which is made up of representatives of the principal institutions in the legal profession and, under the auspices of the Ministry of Justice, advises the government on the legal issues arising in relation to Brexit
 Vice Chairman of the International Trade and Investment Group
 Director of The International Dispute Resolution Centre
 President of the City of London Branch of the Institute of Directors
 Trustee of Cross-Sector Safety and Security Communications
 Magistrate on the Central London Bench
 Chairman of the Trustees of Morden College
 Chairman of the Trustees of the King’s Fund Staff Pension and Life Assurance Plan
 Member of the Board of Co-operation Ireland
 Past President and serves on the Council of the City Livery Club
 President of Langbourn Ward Club
 Trustee of the Jesus College Boat Club (Cambridge) Trust
 Trustee of the Steve Fairbairn Memorial Trust
 Trustee of the Oxford and Cambridge Rowing Foundation
 Trustee of Jesus College Cambridge Society
 Trustee of The Lord Mayor's 800th Anniversary Trust
 Trustee of Gad's Hill Heritage Centre Trust 
 Member of the Institute of Cancer Research
 Honorary Professor at London Metropolitan University Business School
 Honorary Bencher of Grays Inn
 Member of the Council of Royal Society of St George (City of London Branch)
 Member of United Wards’ Club
 Patron of Prisoners Abroad

Wootton is Governor of several institutions, including:

 Bradford Grammar School
 Vice President of King Edward's School, Witley
 Governor and member of the Advisory Council and of the Investment Committee of Goodenough College

and, is a keen supporter of the Livery, being:
 Past Master of the Worshipful Company of Fletchers, the Solicitors’ Company, the Worshipful Company of Information Technologists, the Guild of Freemen, the Worshipful Company of Glaziers and Painters of Glass and the Worshipful Company of Woolmen
 Master of the Company of Watermen and Lightermen
 Renter Warden of the Worshipful Company of Bowyers
 Liveryman of the Worshipful Company of Clockmakers
 Honorary Liveryman of the Worshipful Company of Security Professionals

Wootton is a Steward of Henley Royal Regatta and a member of Leander and London Rowing Clubs, as well as the Athenaeum, the Oxford and Cambridge, East India and City of London Clubs.

He has also been:
 Chairman of Local Partnerships LLP
 Chairman of Northern Ballet
 Co-chairman of the board organising the Global Law Summit in London, February 2015
 President of the City of London Law Society
 Governor of The Honourable the Irish Society
 Chair of the Board of Trustees of the Charles Dickens Museum
 Trustee of the National Opera Studio
Governor of Guildhall School of Music and Drama
 President of the Society of Young Freemen
 Master of the Guild of Freemen of the City of London in 2016.
 President of Farringdon Ward Club
 Almoner of Christ's Hospital
 Chairman of the Misys Charitable Foundation
 Director of the Saudi British Joint Business Council UK
 Music Patron of St Paul’s Cathedral
 Director of the City of London Festival
 Governor of City of London Academy, Southwark
 Member of the Development Board of The Institute of Cancer Research
 Member of the Council of the National Trust (elected)
 Master of the Worshipful Company of Fletchers (2005–06)
 Master of the Solicitors’ Company (2010–11)
 Chancellor of City University London (2011–12)

Wootton was knighted in the 2013 New Year Honours for services to legal business, charity and the City of London".

Wootton was conferred Doctor of Laws honoris causa by the City University London in 2012, Honorary Doctor Staffordshire University, Honorary Fellow Jesus College Cambridge, Honorary Fellow Guildhall School of Music and Drama ("HonFGS"), one of her Majesty’s Lieutenants for the City of London and Knight of Grace of the Most Venerable Order of the Hospital of St John of Jerusalem.

Personal life 
Married to Elizabeth (Liz), they have two sons (James and Christopher), two daughters (Alexandra and Sophie) and eight grandchildren. Sir David and Lady Wootton live in Kent.

Freemasonry 
Wootton is a committed Freemason. In 2007, he served as Senior Grand Warden of the Metropolitan Grand Lodge of London and was Past Grand Sword Bearer in 2012. In March 2014, he was promoted to Assistant Grand Master of the United Grand Lodge of England. In 2022, Sir David was promoted to Deputy Grand Master.

References

External links 
 www.cityoflondon.gov.uk
 Debrett's People of Today

1950 births
Living people
Allen & Overy people
Alumni of Jesus College, Cambridge
Councilmen and Aldermen of the City of London
Freemasons of the United Grand Lodge of England
Lawyers awarded knighthoods
21st-century lord mayors of London
21st-century British politicians
Knights Bachelor
Knights of Justice of the Order of St John
Sheriffs of the City of London
Stewards of Henley Royal Regatta
People educated at Bradford Grammar School
Politicians awarded knighthoods
Sportspeople from Yorkshire